Clerk ( or ) is a patronymic surname of English-language and Scottish-Gaelic origin, ultimately derived from the Latin clericus meaning "scribe", "secretary" or a scholar within a religious order, referring to someone who was educated. Clark evolved from "clerk". First records of the name are found in 12th century England. The name has many variants.

The surname is attached to particular families or noble lineages, such as the Clerk baronets, created in the Baronetage of Nova Scotia by Letters Patent, dated 24 March 1679, and the Ghanaian historic Clerk family of Accra, a distinguished intellectual clan, founded in 1843, that produced a number of pioneering scholars and clergy on the Gold Coast.

Other notable people with the surname include:

 Alexander A. Clerk (born 1947), Ghanaian American sleep medicine specialist and psychiatrist
 Alexander Worthy Clerk (1820–1906), Jamaican Moravian missionary to the Gold Coast
 Archibald Clerk (1813–1887), Church of Scotland minister and a leading Gaelic scholar of the Victorian era
 Carl Henry Clerk (1895–1982), Ghanaian agricultural educator, journalist, editor and Presbyterian minister
 Dugald Clerk (1854–1932), Scottish engineer and designer of the world's first successful two-stroke engine
 Gabrielle Clerk (1923–2012), Canadian psychologist and professor 
 George Clerk (disambiguation)
George Clerk (diplomat) (1874–1951), British diplomat
 George C. Clerk (1931–2019), Ghanaian botanist and plant pathologist
 Sir George Clerk, 6th Baronet (1787–1867), Scottish politician
 Sir George Clerk-Maxwell, 4th Baronet (1715–1784), Scottish landowner
 George Russell Clerk (1800–1889), civil servant in British India
 Sir James Clerk, 3rd Baronet (died 1782) 
 James Clerk Maxwell (1831–1879), Scottish mathematical physicist
 Jane E. Clerk (1904–1999), pioneer woman educationalist administrator on the Gold Coast
 John Clerk (disambiguation)
John Clerk Maxwell of Middlebie (1790–1856), Scottish advocate
 John Clerk of Eldin (1728–1812), Scottish merchant, naval author, artist, geologist and landowner
 John Clerk of Pennycuik (1611–1674), Scottish merchant and archivist of family papers
 John Clerk, Lord Eldin (1757–1832), Scottish judge
 Sir John Clerk, 1st Baronet (died 1722), Scottish politician
 Sir John Clerk, 2nd Baronet (1676–1755), Scottish politician, lawyer, judge and composer
 Sir John Clerk, 5th Baronet (1736–1798), Royal Navy officer
 Matilda J. Clerk (1916–1984), Ghanaian medical pioneer and science educator
 Nicholas Clerk (disambiguation)
Nicholas Clerk (fl. 1407), English politician and the Member (MP) of the Parliament of England for Exeter in 1407
 Nicholas T. Clerk (1930–2012), Ghanaian academic, administrator and Presbyterian minister
 Nicholas Timothy Clerk (1862–1961), Basel-trained theologian and missionary on the Gold Coast
 Pauline M. Clerk (1935–2013), Ghanaian civil servant, diplomat and presidential advisor
 Robert Clerk (disambiguation)
Robert Clerk (–1797), British engineer officer
 Theodore S. Clerk (1909–1965), Ghanaian urban planner and architect

References

English-language surnames
Patronymic surnames
Surnames of English origin
Scottish surnames